The 55th Grey Cup was played between the Hamilton Tiger-Cats and the Saskatchewan Roughriders on December 2, 1967, at Lansdowne Park in Ottawa, before 31,358 fans and was won by the Tiger-Cats by a score of 24–1.

Box Score 

First Quarter

Hamilton – TD – Joe Zuger 3 yard run (Tommy Joe Coffey convert)
Saskatchewan – Rouge – Alan Ford 87 yard punt

Second Quarter

Hamilton – TD – Ted Watkins 72 yard pass from Joe Zuger (Tommy Joe Coffey convert)
Hamilton - Rouge - Tommy Joe Coffey 42 yard missed field goal
Hamilton - Rouge - Joe Zuger punt
Hamilton - Rouge - Joe Zuger punt

Fourth Quarter

Hamilton - Rouge - Joe Zuger punt
Hamilton – TD – Billy Ray Locklin 43 yard fumble return (convert missed)

Game characteristics

Joe Zuger, Hamilton's quarterback, was named the game's Grey Cup Most Valuable Player.

The game marked the sixth consecutive game in the season that the Ticats held their opponents without a touchdown.

Alan Ford's 87 yard punt, on a quick kick, is the longest in Grey Cup history.

References

Videos

External links

Grey Cup programmes (Archived 2009-10-22), an image of the souvenir programme from the 1967 game.

Grey Cup
Grey Cup 55
1967 in Canadian football
Grey Cups hosted in Ottawa
1967 in Ontario
Saskatchewan Roughriders
1960s in Ottawa
1967 in Canadian television
December 1967 sports events in Canada